Alister Carr (born 3 May 1973) is a former Australian rules footballer who played for St Kilda in the Australian Football League (AFL) in 1994. He spent four years at Essendon without playing senior football, before being selected by St Kilda with the last selection in the 1994 Preseason Draft.

In 1994 Carr lived with James Hird and was the best man at his wedding.

References

External links

Living people
1973 births
St Kilda Football Club players
South Bendigo Football Club players
Australian rules footballers from Victoria (Australia)